The World Youth Go Championship (WYGC) is a Go tournament that has been held annually since 1984 making it the second longest running amateur Go tournament in the world.

This event is sponsored by the Ing Foundation, and therefore Ing's rules are used. A number of strong participants in the World Youth Go Championship eventually became World Champions, such as Chang Hao, Gu Li, Lee Sedol.

There is a Junior division for players aged under 12, and a Senior division for players aged under 16.

Past results

See also 

 Mind sport

References 

Annual sporting events
International Go competitions
Go